Ocellularia balangoda is a species of corticolous lichen in the family Graphidaceae. Found in Sri Lanka, it was formally described as a new species in 2014 by lichenologists Gothamie Weerakoon, Robert Lücking, and Helge Thorsten Lumbsch. The specific epithet refers to the prehistoric hominids known as Balangoda Man, who lived in Sri Lanka about 38,000 to 28,500 years ago. The ascospores are hyaline, ellipsoid in shape, contain seven septa, and measure 25–30 by 5–7 μm. Secondary chemicals present in the lichen include protocetraric acid and virensic acid.

See also
 List of Ocellularia species

References

balangoda
Lichen species
Lichens of Sri Lanka
Lichens described in 2014
Taxa named by Helge Thorsten Lumbsch
Taxa named by Robert Lücking
Taxa named by Gothamie Weerakoon